Dimocarpus yunnanensis is a species of tree native to China related to the longan. The drupes are small and inedible. They are sometimes grown in gardens as ornamental plants.

External links
 Dimocarpus yunnanensis info

yunnanensis